Edgar Streltsov (born 14 September 1977) is a former Russian football player.

He currently lives in Switzerland and works for FIFA.

References

External links
 

1977 births
Living people
Russian footballers
FC Metallurg Lipetsk players
FC Rostov players
Russian Premier League players
Russian expatriate footballers
Expatriate footballers in Switzerland
FC Lausanne-Sport players
FC Stade Nyonnais players
Association football forwards